Lexington is a city in Dawson County, Nebraska, United States. The population was 10,348 at the 2020 census. It is the county seat of Dawson County. Lexington is located in southern Nebraska, on the Platte River, southeast of North Platte. It sits along the route of U.S. Route 30 and the Union Pacific Railroad. In the 1860s, Lexington was the location of a stop along the Pony Express.

History
Lexington began as a frontier trading post in 1860. The post was later destroyed. Fort Plum Creek was established near its ruins in 1864. Lexington was founded in 1871. It was originally called Plum Creek.

Plum Creek Railroad Attack
About 3 1/2 miles miles west on route 30, a marker identifies the place  where a band of Cheyennes derailed a railroad train on August 7, 1867, during construction of the first transcontinental railroad.  Boxcars were looted and burned, and three workers were killed.

Geography

Demographics

Lexington is the principal city of the Lexington, Nebraska Micropolitan Statistical Area, which consists of Dawson and Gosper counties.

2010 census
As of the census of 2010, there were 10,230 people, 3,180 households, and 2,320 families living in the city. The racial makeup of the city was 57.9% White, 6.6% African American, 1.2% Native American, 1.0% Asian, 0.4% Pacific Islander, 29.7% from other races, and 3.3% from two or more races. Hispanic or Latino people of any race were 60.4% of the population.

There were 3,180 households, of which 45.0% had children under the age of 18 living with them, 53.9% were married couples living together, 12.2% had a female householder with no husband present, 6.9% had a male householder with no wife present, and 27.0% were non-families. 22.1% of all households were made up of individuals, and 10.1% had someone living alone who was 65 years of age or older. The average household size was 3.17, and the average family size was 3.70.

The median age in the city was 29.4 years. 32.5% of residents were under the age of 18; 10.7% were between the ages of 18 and 24; 26.4% were from 25 to 44; 21.2% were from 45 to 64, and 9.3% were 65 years of age or older. The gender makeup of the city was 51.7% male and 48.3% female.

2000 census
As of the census of 2000, there were 10,011 people, 3,095 households, and 2,237 families living in the city. The population density was 3,401.7 people per square mile (1,314.7/km). There were 3,322 housing units at an average density of 1,128.8 per square mile (436.3/km). The racial makeup of the city was 64.20% White, 0.44% African American, 1.17% Native American, 1.10% Asian, 0.02% Pacific Islander, 30.78% from other races, and 2.30% from two or more races. Hispanic or Latino people of any race were 51.15% of the population.

There were 3,095 households, out of which 43.1% had children under the age of 18 living with them, 57.0% were married couples living together, 9.5% had a female householder with no husband present, and 27.7% were non-families. 21.8% of all households were made up of individuals, and 11.1% had someone living alone who was 65 years of age or older. The average household size was 3.14, and the average family size was 3.65.

In the city, the population was spread out, with 32.6% under the age of 18, 10.2% from 18 to 24, 30.7% from 25 to 44, 16.1% from 45 to 64, and 10.4% who were 65 years of age or older. The median age was 30 years. For every 100 females, there were 108.6 males. For every 100 females age 18 and over, there were 108.6 males.

As of 2000, the median income for a household in the city was $38,098, and the median income for a family was $43,571. Males had a median income of $25,207 versus $20,857 for females. The per capita income for the city was $14,148. About 10.7% of families and 12.9% of the population were below the poverty line, including 16.1% of those under age 18 and 11.5% of those aged 65 or over.

Economy
In 1990, Iowa Beef Packers built a large beef packing plant in Lexington and currently has over 2700 employees.  In 2001, this facility was sold to Tyson.

Arts and culture
The Heartland Museum of Military Vehicles is located in Lexington adjacent to I-80.

The Dawson County Historical Society is a museum with the art pieces made by locals and objects such as cars, guns and household objects from former times that were owned by locals.

Media
Radio
KRVN (AM) and KRVN-FM are in Lexington, owned by the Nebraska Rural Radio Association. The radio network (KRVN (AM), KNEB (AM), and KTIC (AM)) is owned and operated by a cooperative of farmers and ranchers, which was founded in 1948 and started KRVN in 1951.

Newspaper
Lexington is served by the biweekly Lexington Clipper-Herald.

Sports
From 1956 to 1958, Lexington was home to the Lexington Red Sox, who were a minor league baseball team. Playing at the Dawson County Fairgrounds, the Red Sox were members of Nebraska State League as an affiliate of the Boston Red Sox. The 1956 Lexington Red Sox captured the Nebraska State League Championship.

Notable people
 Bill Barrett - U.S. Congressman
 Aage Brix - competitor in soccer at the 1924 Olympics
 Monte Kiffin - football coach
 Donald Roe Ross - United States federal court judge and mayor of Lexington, Nebraska
 Wee Willie Smith - football player
 Mick Tingelhoff - Pro Football Hall of Fame inductee
 John Wightman - lawyer, Nebraska state legislator, and mayor of Lexington, Nebraska
 Yoskar Galván-Mercado - Current Profesional Soccer player for Union Omaha.

See also
Impact of the 2019–20 coronavirus pandemic on the meat industry in the United States

References

External links

 City of Lexington
 White Flight in Rural America: The Case Study of Lexington, Nebraska
 Lexington and You

Cities in Nebraska
Micropolitan areas of Nebraska
Hispanic and Latino American culture in Nebraska
Cities in Dawson County, Nebraska
County seats in Nebraska
Pony Express stations